Carpathonesticus borutzkyi  is a species of araneomorph spider of the family Nesticidae. It occurs in Russia, Georgia, Turkey and Ukraine and is found in caves.

Original publication

References 

Nesticidae
Spiders described in 1930
Spiders of Europe
Spiders of Russia
Arthropods of Turkey
Spiders of Georgia (country)